Bukuwe Bisare (Assamese: বুকুৱে বিচাৰে) is an Assamese language film directed by fashion designer Dipankar Kashyap. It is a debut film of the director produced by his sister Shikha Kashyap and Dipali Chowdhury. The film stars Kapil Bora, Zerifa Wahid and Ravi Sarma. The story is about friendship and love shot in exotic locales in Kalimpong and Sikkim. The lyrics are penned by Prasanta Morang.

See also
Jollywood Assamese

References

2004 films
Films shot in Sikkim
Films set in Assam
2000s Assamese-language films